Horsey, Horsey is a comedy song written in 1937 by Paddy Roberts, Elton Box, Desmond Cox and Ralph Butler and which was made popular by Jack Jackson, Billy Cotton and Henry Hall.

Original lyrics:

[Verse 1]
Farmer Grey's got a one-horse shay,
He takes to town on market day.
Travelling home while the lights are low,
He sings this song and away they go.

[Chorus]
Horsey, horsey, don't you stop,
Just let your feet go clipity clop. 
Your tail goes swish and your wheels go round,
Giddy up, we're homeward bound.

Horsey, horsey, on your way,
We've got a journey of many a day.
Your tail goes swish and your wheels go round,
Giddy up, we're homeward bound.

We ain't in a hustle,
We ain't in a bustle,
Don't go tearing up the road.
We ain't in a hurry,
We ain't in a flurry,
And we ain't got a very heavy load.

So horsey, horsey, on your way,
We've got a journey of many a day.
Your tail goes swish and your wheels go round,
Giddy up, we're homeward bound.

[Verse 2]
Going home, when they get half way,
They call a halt at the "Load of Hay".
He has just one, then he has one more,
And you'll hear him singing after three or four.

[Chorus]
Horsey, horsey, don't you stop,
Just let your feet go clipity clop. 
Your tail goes swish and your wheels go round,
Giddy up, we're homeward bound.

Horsey, horsey, on your way,
We've got a journey of many a day.
Your tail goes swish and your wheels go round,
Giddy up, we're homeward bound."

We ain't in a hustle,
We ain't in a bustle,
Don't go tearing up the road.
We ain't in a hurry, 
We ain't in a flurry,
And we ain't got a very heavy load.

So horsey, horsey, on your way,
We've got a journey of many a day.
Your tail goes swish and your wheels go round,
Giddy up, we're homeward bound.

You don't need the whip, now goodness knows.
You don't need the reins so I'll take a little doze.

Horsey, horsey, on your way,
We've got a journey of many a day.
Your tail goes swish and your wheels go round,
Giddy up, we're homeward bound.

The chorus is mostly sung as a round and the verses not sung.
The chorus of the song was sung by Ruth Madoc (as Gladys Pugh) in an episode of the BBC TV situation comedy, Hi-de-Hi! ('The Pay Off', 1982), set in a holiday camp in the late 1950s.

Sources

Original sheet music: "Horsey! Horsey!" Published by The Sun Music Co. Ltd. London WC2 and printed in London England by The Compton Printing Works (London) Ltd.

Comedy songs
Songs with lyrics by Ralph Butler
1937 songs